Crane Mosque, also known as Qingbai Liufang Mosque, is a mosque located in Yangzhou, Jiangsu, China. Alongside Huaisheng Mosque, Qingjing Mosque and Phoenix Mosque, it is one of the Four Great Mosques in the coastal areas of China.

History 
Crane Mosque was originally built in 1275 by Arab Muslim Puhading, the 16th grandson of Muhammad. The shape of the mosque is like a crane, hence the name "Crane Mosque". The mosque was severely damaged by wars during the late Yuan dynasty (1271–1368). Arab Muslim Hasan rebuilt the mosque in 1390, at the dawn of the Ming dynasty (1368–1644). It was renovated and refurbished in 1523, during the reign of Jiajing Emperor (1521–1567).

In April 1995, it was inscribed as a provincial cultural relic preservation organ by the Jiangsu government.

References 

14th-century establishments in China
Mosques completed in 1390
Buildings and structures in Yangzhou
Religious buildings and structures in Jiangsu
Mosques in China